Cherokee County is a county located in the U.S. state of Texas. As of the 2020 census, its population was 50,412. The county seat is Rusk, which lies 130 miles southeast of Dallas and 160 miles north of Houston. The county was named for the Cherokee, who lived in the area before being expelled in 1839. Cherokee County comprises the Jacksonville micropolitan statistical area, which is also included in the Tyler–Jacksonville combined statistical area.

History

Native Americans

The Hasinai group of the Caddo tribe built a village in the area in around AD 800 and continued to live in the area until the 1830s, when they migrated to the Brazos River. The federal government moved them to the Brazos Indian Reservation in 1855 and later to Oklahoma.

The Cherokee, Delaware, Shawnee, and Kickapoo Native American peoples began settling in the area around 1820. The Texas Cherokee tried unsuccessfully to gain a grant to their own land from the Mexican government.

Sam Houston, adopted son of Chief Oolooteka (John Jolly) of the Cherokee, negotiated the January 14, 1836, treaty between Chief Bowl of the Cherokee and the Republic of Texas. On December 16, 1837, the Texas Senate declared the treaty null and void, and encroachment upon Cherokee lands continued. On October 5, 1838, Indians massacred members of the Isaac Killough family at their farm northwest of the site of present Jacksonville, leading to the Cherokee War of 1839 and the expulsion of some to Oklahoma. Some went to Monclova in Mexico, and some to Rusk and Gregg counties (many had relatives among the Choctaw/Chickasaw/Creek community there). Later, in 1844, President Polk issued an executive order known as "The Right to return", allowing many Cherokee to return to Texas. Some came to what is now Cherokee County.

Early exploration and settlers
Domingo Terán de los Ríos and Father Damián Massanet explored the area on behalf of Spain in 1691. Louis Juchereau de St. Denis began trading with the Hasinais in 1705. Nuestro Padre San Francisco de los Tejas was originally established in 1690, but was re-established in 1716 by Captain Domingo Ramon. It was abandoned again because of French incursions and re-established in 1721 by the Marques de San Miguel de Aguyao.

In 1826, empresario David G. Burnet received a grant from the Coahuila y Tejas legislature to settle 300 families. The settlers were mostly from the Southern states, and brought the lifestyle of that region with them. By contracting how many families each grantee could settle, the government sought to have some control over colonization.

County established and growth

Cherokee County was formed from land given by Nacogdoches County in 1846. It was organized in the same year. The town of Rusk became the county seat. Cherokee County voted in favor of secession from the Union, during the build-up to the American Civil War.

In 1872, the International – Great Northern Railroad caused Jacksonville to relocate two miles east, to be near the tracks. The Kansas and Gulf Short Line Railway was built north-to-south through the county between 1882 and 1885. The Texas and New Orleans Railroad in 1905, and the Texas State Railroad in 1910, each gave rise to new county towns along their tracks.

Geography

Major highways
  U.S. Highway 69
  U.S. Highway 79
  U.S. Highway 84
  U.S. Highway 175
  State Highway 21
  State Highway 110
  State Highway 135
  State Highway 204
  State Highway 294

Adjacent counties
 Smith County (north)
 Rusk County (northeast, east)
 Nacogdoches County (east, southeast)
 Angelina County (southeast)
 Houston County (southwest)
 Anderson County (west)
 Henderson County (northwest)

National protected area
 Neches River National Wildlife Refuge (part)

Communities

Cities

 Gallatin
 Jacksonville
 New Summerfield
 Reklaw (partly in Rusk County)
 Rusk (county seat)
 Troup (mostly in Smith County)

Towns
 Alto
 Bullard (mostly in Smith County)
 Cuney
 Wells

Census-designated place
 Shadybrook

Unincorporated communities

 Blackjack
 Central High
 Circle
 Concord
 Cove Springs
 Craft
 Dialville
 Elm Grove
 Forest
 Gould
 Henry's Chapel
 Ironton
 Linwood
 Maydelle
 Mixon
 Mount Selman
 New Hope
 Oakland
 Pine Grove
 Ponta
 Reese
 Salem
 Shady Grove
 Sweet Union
 Weeping Mary

Ghost towns

 Atoy
 Brunswick
 Bulah
 Corine
 Earle's Chapel
 Emmaus
 Etna
 Griffin
 Java
 Larissa
 Lone Star
 Mewshaw
 Morrill
 New Birmingham
 Pierces Chapel
 Prices
 Redlawn
 Rock Hill
 Tecula
 Turney
 Wildhurst

Demographics

Note: the US Census treats Hispanic/Latino as an ethnic category. This table excludes Latinos from the racial categories and assigns them to a separate category. Hispanics/Latinos can be of any race.

At the 2000 United States census there were 46,659 people, 16,651 households, and 12,105 families resided in the county. The population density was 44 people per square mile (17/km2). The 19,173 housing units averaged 18 per square mile (7/km2). The racial and ethnic makeup of the county was 74.34% White, 15.96% Black or African American, 0.47% Native American, 0.40% Asian, 0.06% Pacific Islander, 7.43% from other races, and 1.34% from two or more races. About 13.24% of the population was Hispanic or Latino of any race. By 2020, its population increased to 50,412. The racial and ethnic makeup at the 2020 United States census was 59.70% non-Hispanic white, 12.61% Black or African American, 0.25% American Indian and Alaska Native, 0.52% Asian, 0.04% Pacific Islander, 0.24% some other race, 3.23% two or more races, and 23.40% Hispanic or Latino of any race. The increase among its Hispanic and Asian American populations represented the nationwide demographic shift since the 2020 census.

Of the 16,651 households in 2000, 33.40% had children under the age of 18 living with them, 55.70% were married couples living together, 12.80% had a female householder with no husband present, and 27.30% were not families. Around 24.20% of all households were made up of individuals, and 11.90% had someone living alone who was 65 years of age or older. The average household size was 2.63, and the average family size was 3.11. In 2020 according to the American Community Survey, there were 18,540 households with an average household size of 2.65 and average family size of 3.07.

At the 2000 census, the median income for a household in the county was $29,313, and for a family was $34,750. Males had a median income of $26,410 versus $19,788 for females. The per capita income for the county was $13,980. About 13.70% of families and 17.90% of the population were below the poverty line, including 23.30% of those under age 18 and 15.10% of those age 65 or over. The 2020 American Community Survey's estimates determined there was a median household income of $50,199 with a per capita income of $66,658.

Media
Cherokee County is part of the Tyler/Longview/Jacksonville DMA. Local media outlets are:  KLTV, KTRE-TV, KYTX-TV, KFXK-TV, KCEB-TV, and KETK-TV.

Newspapers in the county include the Jacksonville Progress, which publishes three editions a week in Jacksonville, and the weekly Cherokeean Herald in Rusk.

Education
School districts within Cherokee County Texas include the following:
 Alto Independent School District
 Bullard Independent School District
 Carlisle Independent School District
 Jacksonville Independent School District
 New Summerfield Independent School District
 Rusk Independent School District
 Troup Independent School District
 Wells Independent School District

Areas in Bullard, Jacksonville, New Summerfield, Rusk, and Troup are assigned to Tyler Junior College. Areas of Cherokee County in Alto ISD and Wells ISD are assigned to Angelina College. Areas in Carlisle ISD are assigned to Kilgore College. Legislation does not specify a community college for the remainder of the county.

Politics

See also

 National Register of Historic Places listings in Cherokee County, Texas
 Recorded Texas Historic Landmarks in Cherokee County
 Travis Clardy, Texas state representative from Cherokee County

References

External links

 Cherokee County in Handbook of Texas Online at the University of Texas
 Historic Cherokee County materials, hosted by the Portal to Texas History.
 Cherokee County Sons of Confederate Veterans

 
1846 establishments in Texas
Populated places established in 1846